The Seventh Sin is a 1957 American drama film directed by Ronald Neame and starring Eleanor Parker, Bill Travers and George Sanders. It is based on the 1925 novel The Painted Veil by W. Somerset Maugham.

Plot
In post-World War II Hong Kong, unhappily married Carol (Eleanor Parker) has an affair with Paul (Jean Pierre Aumont), a married man. Her physician husband Walter (Bill Travers) discovers it and presents her with a choice: travel with him to a remote mainland village (where he will fight a cholera epidemic) or face the scandal of a very public divorce. She persuades him to reconsider, and he proposes an alternative. If Paul's wife will agree to a divorce and if he marries Carol within one week, Walter will obtain a quiet divorce. Carol presents Walter's offer to Paul, who declines, claiming respect for his wife.

Carol sees her only choice is to accompany Walter to the village, where she meets the rakish and booze-soaked consul Tim (George Sanders). He soon introduces her to nuns at the local hospital-convent, and Carol begins to re-evaluate her self-absorbed life and character.

Working at the convent, Carol learns she is pregnant. She tells Walter she's unsure who is the father, and he regrets her honesty. Shortly after, Walter contracts cholera and dies. Carol returns to Hong Kong with an uncertain future.

Cast

Production
The film was announced as a vehicle for Ava Gardner.

It was adapted for the screen by Karl Tunberg and directed by Ronald Neame. Neame left the film during production, and Vincente Minnelli took over and was uncredited.

Reception
According to MGM records, the film earned $250,000 in the U.S .and Canada and $475,000 in other markets, resulting in a loss of $1.2 million.

See also
 List of American films of 1957
 The Painted Veil (1934)
 The Painted Veil (2006)

References

External links
 
 
 
 

Films based on British novels
1957 films
American black-and-white films
Films directed by Ronald Neame
Films set in China
Films based on works by W. Somerset Maugham
1957 drama films
Films scored by Miklós Rózsa
Metro-Goldwyn-Mayer films
CinemaScope films
1950s English-language films